Michel Llorca (9 June 1927 – 11 March 2007) was a French racing cyclist. He rode in the 1952 Tour de France.

References

1927 births
2007 deaths
French male cyclists
Place of birth missing